Jasmin Pllana (born 6 January 1989) is an Austrian professional association football player currently playing for SKU Amstetten. He plays as a defender.

External links

1989 births
Living people
Austrian footballers
Association football defenders
SV Ried players